Reggie Jackson (born 1946) is an American former professional baseball player.

Reggie Jackson may also refer to:

Reggie Jackson (basketball, born 1973), American former basketball forward
Reggie Jackson (basketball, born 1990), American basketball guard in the National Basketball Association

See also
Reginald Jackson (disambiguation)